is a passenger railway station located in the city of Sennan, Osaka Prefecture, Japan, operated by the private railway operator Nankai Electric Railway. It has the station number "NK36".

Lines

Layout
The station consists of one side platform and one island platforms connected by a footbridge.

Platforms

Adjacent stations

History
Tarui Station opened on 9 November 1897.

Passenger statistics
In fiscal 2019, the station was used by an average of 7956 passengers daily.

Surrounding area
 Tarui Public Hall
 Sennan Post Office

See also
 List of railway stations in Japan

References

External links

  

Railway stations in Japan opened in 1897
Railway stations in Osaka Prefecture
Sennan, Osaka